Zhong Xingping (born July 8, 1987) is a female Chinese trampoline gymnast. She won silver medal in the 2013 Trampoline World championship at Sofia, Bulgaria and 2014 Asian Games – Women's trampoline at Incheon, South Korea.

References

External links
 

1987 births
Living people
Chinese female trampolinists
Asian Games medalists in gymnastics
Asian Games silver medalists for China
Gymnasts at the 2006 Asian Games
Gymnasts at the 2014 Asian Games
Medalists at the 2006 Asian Games
Medalists at the 2014 Asian Games
Medalists at the Trampoline Gymnastics World Championships
Gymnasts from Guangdong
21st-century Chinese women